The Sudanese records in swimming are the fastest ever performances of swimmers from Sudan, which are recognised and ratified by the Sudan Amateur Swimming Association.

All records were set in finals unless noted otherwise.

Long Course (50 m)

Men

Women

Short Course (25 m)

Men

Women

Mixed relay

References

Sudan
Records
Swimming